The Derby di Sicilia or Sicilian Derby in English, is a local derby between Italian football clubs Calcio Catania and S.S.D. Palermo.  Catania and Palermo are the two main cities on the island of Sicily, and the teams are fierce rivals. However, they have seldom played each other within the Italian football league system, because in many seasons they have played in separate divisions of the league. The first time the Sicilian derby took place in the context of league football was on November 1, 1936, at Palermo in Serie B level; it ended in a 1–1 draw.  The Sicilian derby has been played 10 times in Serie A: Catania leading their rivals by 5 victories to Palermo's 4; the other occasion was drawn. The teams have also met in local Sicilian competitions, and friendly matches.

The most notorious derby was on 2 February 2007, when 40-year-old policeman Filippo Raciti died in Catania from severe liver injuries during riots following the derby. The events led FIGC commissioner Luca Pancalli to indefinitely suspend all professional and amateur football games in the country.

For the 2007 season, all Palermo fans were banned from Catania's Stadio Massimino for the Catania-Palermo match on December 2, 2007. Catania subsequently proceeded to defeat Palermo 3–1, a historic derby win for Catania, their first in Serie A.

Statistics
As of 3 March 2021

Results

League results

(1) See 2007 Catania football violence for more details about the riots during and following the match.
(2) 2–0 Catania victory later awarded by the Federation. The match ended in a 1–0 win for Palermo.

Cup results

Sicilian derbies with Atletico Catania
For five seasons, Palermo played an "alternate" Sicilian derby against Atletico Catania, a minor team which reached its peak during the late 1990s, when it was the major football club in Catania, following the disbandment of the old Calcio Catania. In 1999–2000 and 2000–2001, Palermo contested derbies with both Catania and Atletico Catania, as all three teams were playing Serie C1/B at the time.

References

Palermo F.C.
Catania S.S.D.
Sicilia
Sport in Sicily